Endless Harmony may refer to:

 "Endless Harmony", a song written by Bruce Johnston and included on the 1980 Beach Boys album Keepin' the Summer Alive
 Endless Harmony: The Beach Boys Story, a 1998 documentary about The Beach Boys
 Endless Harmony Soundtrack, a compilation album of previously unissued recordings released in connection with the documentary